La visita is a 1963 Italian comedy film directed by Antonio Pietrangeli. It was entered into the 14th Berlin International Film Festival.

Cast
 Sandra Milo - Pina
 François Périer - Adolfo Di Palma 
 Mario Adorf - Cucaracha
 Gastone Moschin - Renato Gusso
 Angela Minervini - Chiaretta
 Ettore Baraldi
 Giancarlo Bellagamba
 Bruno Benatti
 Paola Del Bon
 Ferdinando Gerra
 Abele Reggiani
 Carla Vivian
 Didi Perego - Nella

References

External links

1963 films
1963 comedy films
Italian comedy films
1960s Italian-language films
Italian black-and-white films
Films set in Italy
Films set in Emilia-Romagna
Films directed by Antonio Pietrangeli
Films set in Ferrara
Films with screenplays by Ruggero Maccari
1960s Italian films